The Oklahoma Sooners football statistical leaders are individual statistical leaders of the Oklahoma Sooners football program in various categories, including passing, rushing, receiving, total offense, defensive stats, and kicking. Within those areas, the lists identify single-game, single-season, and career leaders. The Sooners represent the University of Oklahoma in the NCAA's Big 12 Conference.

Although Oklahoma began competing in intercollegiate football in 1895, the school's official record book considers the "modern era" to have begun in 1946. Records from before this year are often incomplete and inconsistent, and they are generally not included in these lists.

These lists are dominated by more recent players for several reasons:
 Since 1946, seasons have increased from 10 games to 11 and then 12 games in length.
 The NCAA didn't allow freshmen to play varsity football until 1972 (with the exception of the World War II years), allowing players to have four-year careers.
 Bowl games only began counting toward single-season and career statistics in 2002. The Sooners have played in a bowl game every year since then, giving players since 2002 an additional game to accumulate statistics. Similarly, the Sooners have played in the Big 12 Championship Game 10 times since 2000.
 Due to COVID-19 issues, the NCAA ruled that the 2020 season would not count against the athletic eligibility of any football player, giving everyone who played in that season the opportunity for five years of eligibility instead of the normal four.
 The Sooners eclipsed 5,000 total offensive yards as a team all but twice (for a total of 16 times) during the tenure of Bob Stoops as head coach from 1999 to 2016, and did so again during the first two seasons of Stoops' successor Lincoln Riley in 2017 and 2018. Oklahoma had only done this eight times before Stoops' arrival. In addition, the 2017 and 2018 seasons marked the 11th and 12th times the Sooners accumulated over 6,000 yards, with the other 10 times occurring during Stoops' tenure as head coach. The team had never accomplished this feat before Stoops took over.

These lists are updated through Oklahoma's game against Houston on September 1, 2019.

Passing

Passing yards

Passing touchdowns

Rushing

Rushing yards

Rushing touchdowns

Receiving

Receptions

Receiving yards

Receiving touchdowns

Total offense
Total offense is the sum of passing and rushing statistics. It does not include receiving or returns.

Total offense yards

Touchdowns responsible for
"Touchdowns responsible for" is the NCAA's official term for combined passing and rushing touchdowns.

Defense

Interceptions

Tackles

Sacks

Kicking

Field goals made

Field goal percentage

Footnotes

References

Oklahoma